The Safiaal Rajputs, also spelled Sufial (Sufiaal), are a Muslim claim himself Rajput tribe of Jammu and Punjab provinces of Pakistan.

Safiaal claim they are Muslim rajputs of Rajouri, Jammu  They were given the title Malik (prince) by the Mughal Throne for their bravery and service to the Mughal imperial army only on the basis of this they claim himself Rajput.  They were Hindus from Punjab Haryana, where they were called "Malkana Rajput.

In Agra District, the Malkana claimed descent from a number of Hindu castes. Those of Kiraoli, where they occupy five villages, claim descent from a Jat. Malik is one of largest clan of jat in Haryana punjab and Rajasthan.. 19th Army chief of Indian Army Ved Prakash Malik  belong to jat malik community. The Mughal emperor Akbar gave the title of Malik to this Safiaal clan . They were given preference in Akbar's army and deputed on the crossing points of the Kashmir Valley on the high reaches of Pir Panjal. Later on, they embraced Islam. This clan is located in the higher points of Rajouri District at the foot of Pir Panjal. This region is known by the name of this clan as "Darhaal Malkan". They have also settled in other districts of the state such as Doda, Poonch, the Valley of Kashmir, and some villages in the District Rajouri.  Some of them moved into Pakistan at the time of Partition but the majority of them still live in Darhaal, and speak Pahari. Today, they use the title of Malik, Chaudry, or Sardar'According to their tribal traditions, they are of Malkana Rajput stock, who like other Malik groups came to the Pir Panjaal during the period of Akbar’s rule.

References

Rajputs
Rajput clans of Punjab